Allan "Rocky" Lane (born Harry Leonard Albershardt; September 22, 1909 – October 27, 1973) was an American studio leading man and the star of many cowboy B-movies in the 1940s and 1950s. He appeared in more than 125 films and TV shows in a career lasting from 1929 to 1966. He is best known for his portrayal of Red Ryder and for being the voice of the talking horse on the television series Mister Ed, beginning in 1961.

Biography
Lane was born as Harry Leonard Albershardt or Albershart (sources differ) in Mishawaka, Indiana to Linnie Anne and William H. Albershardt. He grew up in Grand Rapids, Michigan. Lane had been a photographer, model and stage actor by age 20.

Lane played varsity sports (baseball, football, and basketball) at the University of Notre Dame but dropped out in order to pursue his interests in acting.

Film career
He was spotted by Fox Film Corporation (later 20th Century Fox) talent scouts and was signed to a contract. His first film role for Fox was as a romantic lead opposite June Collyer in the 1929 release, Not Quite Decent (now a lost film). He made several other films at Fox but jumped ship to Warner Bros. in the early 1930s. 

While at Warner his career foundered, and after a number of bit parts he left films in the early 1930s. By 1936, Lane returned to films and to 20th Century Fox, taking supporting roles in the drama Laughing at Trouble and the Shirley Temple film Stowaway. After several more supporting roles at Fox, Lane longed for a starring role; therefore, he took the lead in a Republic Pictures' short feature, The Duke Comes Back (1937).

From 1929 through 1936, he appeared in twenty-four films. He was in 1938's The Law West of Tombstone. In 1940, he portrayed "RCMP Sergeant Dave King", the role becoming one of his most notable successes. The first was King of the Royal Mounted, a 12-part 1940 serial adaptation of Zane Grey's King of the Royal Mounted. He starred in several Royal Canadian Mounted Police films, including the serials The Yukon Patrol and King of the Mounties. He is best remembered for these today.

In 1946 and 1947, he portrayed Red Ryder in seven films, replacing Wild Bill Elliott in that role. The following year, he became "Rocky Lane" in Western films.

Between 1940 and 1966, Lane made eighty-two film and television series appearances, mostly in westerns. Between 1947 and 1953, he made over 30 B-movie westerns (as "Rocky" Lane) with his faithful horse 'Black Jack'.

His last roles were in voice-over acting, including providing the speech for Mister Ed (1961–1966). He was never credited on-screen for providing the voice for Mister Ed.

In 2003, he won the TV Land Award posthumously for the category "Favorite Pet-Human Relationship" as Mr. Ed.

Death 
Lane died in California of cancer in 1973, at age 64. His interment was located at Inglewood Park Cemetery.

In popular culture

Between 1965 and 1968 a celebrity comic was created around Rocky Lane's cowboy persona, written and drawn by Brazilian comics artist Primaggio Mantovi.

Lane was one of the movie cowboys named in the lyrics of the song “Whatever Happened To Randolph Scott” by The Statler Brothers, which became a hit single in 1974.

Selected filmography

 Not Quite Decent (1929) as Jerry Connor
 The Forward Pass (1929) as Ed Kirby
 Love in the Rough (1930) as Johnson
 Madame Satan (1930) as Zeppelin Majordomo (uncredited)
 Night Nurse (1931) as Intern (uncredited)
 The Star Witness (1931) as Young Deputy at the Leeds Home (uncredited)
 Honor of the Family (1931) as Joseph
 Expensive Women (1931) as Party Boy with Bobby (uncredited)
 Local Boy Makes Good (1931) as Runner with a Bad Knee (uncredited)
 The Famous Ferguson Case (1932) as Reporter (uncredited)
 The Tenderfoot (1932) as Actor (uncredited)
 Week-End Marriage (1932) as Office Clerk (uncredited)
 Winner Take All (1932) as Monty - Joan's Friend (uncredited)
 Miss Pinkerton (1932) as Herbert Wynn (scenes deleted)
 Crooner (1932) as Heckler on Dance Floor (uncredited)
 A Successful Calamity (1932) as Polo Player (uncredited)
 The Crash (1932) as Geoffrey's Associate (uncredited)
 One Way Passage (1932) as Friend of Joan's (uncredited)
 Laughing at Trouble (1936) as John Campbell
 Stowaway (1936) as Richard Hope
 Step Lively, Jeeves! (1937) as Party Guest (uncredited)
 Charlie Chan at the Olympics (1937) as Richard Masters
 The Jones Family in Big Business (1937) as Ted Hewett
 Fifty Roads to Town (1937) as Leroy Smedley
 Sing and Be Happy (1937) as Hamilton Howe
 The Duke Comes Back (1937) as Duke Foster
 Night Spot (1938) as Pete Cooper
 Maid's Night Out (1938) as Bill Norman
 This Marriage Business (1938) as Bill Bennett
 Having Wonderful Time (1938) as Maxwell Pingwell aka Mac
 Crime Ring (1938) as Joe Ryan
 Fugitives for a Night (1938) as John Nelson
 The Law West of Tombstone (1938) as Danny Sanders
 Pacific Liner (1939) as Bilson
 Twelve Crowded Hours (1939) as Dave Sanders
 They Made Her a Spy (1939) as James Huntley
 Panama Lady (1939) as Dennis McTeague
 The Spellbinder (1939) as Steve Kindal
 Conspiracy (1939) as Steve Kendall
 Grand Ole Opry (1940) as Fred Barnes
 King of the Royal Mounted (1940, Serial) as Dave King
 All-American Co-Ed (1941) as Second Senior
 King of the Mounties (1942) as Sergeant Dave King
 Air Force (1943) as Marine (uncredited)
 Daredevils of the West (1943) as Duke Cameron
 The Dancing Masters (1943) as George Worthing
 Call of the South Seas (1944) as Kendall Gaige
 The Tiger Woman (1944) as Allen Saunders
 Silver City Kid (1944) as Jack Adams
 Stagecoach to Monterey (1944) as Bruce Redmond - Posing as Chick Weaver
 Sheriff of Sundown (1944) as Tex Jordan
 The Topeka Terror (1945) as Chad Stevens
 Corpus Christi Bandits (1945) as Capt. James Christie / Corpus Christi Jim
 Bells of Rosarita (1945) as Himself
 Trail of Kit Carson (1945) as Bill Harmon
 Gay Blades (1946) as Andy Buell
 A Guy Could Change (1946) as Michael 'Mike' Hogan
 Night Train to Memphis (1946) as Dan Acuff
 Santa Fe Uprising (1946) as Red Ryder
 Out California Way (1946) as Himself
 Stagecoach to Denver (1946) as Red Ryder
 Vigilantes of Boomtown (1947) as Red Ryder
 Homesteaders of Paradise Valley (1947) as Red Ryder
 Oregon Trail Scouts (1947) as Red Ryder
 Rustlers of Devil's Canyon (1947) as Red Ryder
 Marshal of Cripple Creek (1947) as Red Ryder
 The Wild Frontier (1947) as Rocky Lane
 Bandits of Dark Canyon (1947) as Rocky Lane
 Oklahoma Badlands (1948) as Allan Rocky Lane
 The Bold Frontiersman (1948) as Rocky Lane
 Carson City Raiders (1948) as Rocky Lane
 Marshal of Amarillo (1948) as Marshal Rocky Lane
 Desperadoes of Dodge City (1948) as Rocky Lane
 The Denver Kid (1948) as Rocky Lane Posing as the Denver Kid
 Sundown in Santa Fe (1948) as Rocky Lane
 Renegades of Sonora (1948) as Rocky Lane
 Sheriff of Wichita (1949) as Sheriff Rocky Lane
 Death Valley Gunfighter (1949) as Rocky Lane
 Frontier Investigator (1949) as Rocky Lane
 The Wyoming Bandit (1949) as Marshal Rocky Lane
 Bandit King of Texas (1949) as Rocky Lane
 Navajo Trail Raiders (1949) as Rocky Lane
 Powder River Rustlers (1949) as Rocky Lane
 Gunmen of Abilene (1950) as Rocky Lane
 Code of the Silver Sage (1950) as Lt. Rocky Lane
 Salt Lake Raiders (1950) as Deputy Marshal Rocky Lane
 Covered Wagon Raid (1950) as Rocky Lane
 Vigilante Hideout (1950) as Rocky Lane
 Frisco Tornado (1950) as Marshal Rocky Lane
 Rustlers on Horseback (1950) as Marshal Rocky Lane
 Trail of Robin Hood (1950) as Rocky Lane
 Rough Riders of Durango (1951) as Rocky Lane
 Night Riders of Montana (1951) as Rocky Lane
 Wells Fargo Gunmaster (1951) as Rocky Lane
 Fort Dodge Stampede (1951) as Deputy Sheriff Rocky Lane
 Desert of Lost Men (1951) as Rocky Lane 
 Captive of Billy the Kid (1952) as Marshal 'Rocky' Lane
 Leadville Gunslinger (1952) as U. S. Marshal Rocky Lane
 Black Hills Ambush (1952) as Rocky Lane
 Thundering Caravans (1952) as Marshal Rocky Lane
 Desperadoes' Outpost (1952) as Rocky Lane
 Marshal of Cedar Rock (1953) as Marshal Rocky Lane
 Savage Frontier (1953) as U.S. Marshal Rocky Lane
 Bandits of the West (1953) as Marshal Rocky Lane
 El Paso Stampede (1953) as Rocky Lane
 The Saga of Hemp Brown (1958) as Sheriff
 Hell Bent for Leather (1960) as Kelsey
 Posse from Hell (1961) as Burl Hogan

Television
Series
 Mister Ed, 1961–1966 syndicated and later CBS TV series. Lane provided the voice for Mister Ed. This was an uncredited role.
 Red Ryder, 1956–1957 TV series. Lane portrayed Red Ryder

Guest appearances
 Cheyenne, episode "Massacre at Gunsight Pass", originally aired May 1, 1961
 Gunsmoke, episode "Long Hours, Short Pay", originally aired April 29, 1961
 Bonanza, episode "The Blood Line", originally aired December 31, 1960
 Gunsmoke, episode "The Badge", originally aired November 12, 1960
 Lawman, episode "The Payment", originally aired May 8, 1960
 Bronco, episode "Death of an Outlaw", originally aired March 8, 1960
 Colt .45, episode "Arizona Anderson", originally aired February 14, 1960
 Tales of Wells Fargo, episode "The Reward", originally aired April 21, 1958
 Wagon Train, episode "The Daniel Barrister Story", originally aired April 16, 1958
 Alfred Hitchcock Presents, episode "Lamb to the Slaughter", originally aired April 13, 1958
 Gunsmoke, episode "Texas Cowboys", originally aired April 5, 1958
 Mike Hammer, episode "Husbands Are Bad Luck", originally aired 1957

References

External links

Rocky Lane westerns
Recollections of Allan Lane
FanBase page - Notre Dame Football

1909 births
1973 deaths
20th-century American male actors
American male film actors
American male television actors
American male voice actors
Burials at Inglewood Park Cemetery
Deaths from cancer in California
Male actors from Indiana
People from Mishawaka, Indiana
University of Notre Dame alumni